Michigan's 9th congressional district  is a United States congressional district located in The Thumb and northern portions of Metro Detroit of the State of Michigan. Counties either wholly or partially located within the district include: Huron, Tuscola, Sanilac, Lapeer, St. Clair, Macomb and Oakland.

Recent election results from statewide races

History
Prior to 1992 the 9th congressional district did not overlap at all with the one that existed after 1992.  It largely corresponded to the later Michigan's 2nd congressional district, covering most of the western shore counties starting with Muskegon and taking in a portion of Grand Traverse County.  It also included about half of Ottawa County, Montcalm County, half of Ionia County, and two eastern townships of Kent County, Michigan.

The district from 1992 to 2002 was largely based in Pontiac and Flint–essentially, the successor of the old 7th district. The strong Democratic voting record in Flint and Pontiac compensated for the largely Republican leaning of most of the rest of the district's area.
 
In 2002, this district essentially became the 5th district, while the 9th was reconfigured to take in most of the Oakland County portion of the old 11th district. The only areas that survived in the 9th congressional district across the 2002 redistricting were Pontiac, Waterford, Auburn Hills, some of Orion Township, Oakland Township, Rochester and Rochester Hills.  This district was for all practical purposes the one eliminated by the 2012 redistricting.  Portions of it were parceled out to four different districts, all of which largely preserved other former districts. The current 9th is mostly the successor of the old 10th district.

The district is currently represented by Lisa McClain.

Cities and villages

Cities

Villages

List of representatives

Elections

Historical district boundaries

See also
Michigan's congressional districts
List of United States congressional districts

Notes

District boundaries were redrawn in 1993, and 2003 due to reapportionment following the censuses of 1990 and 2000.

References
 Gary Peters's webpage
 Govtrack.us for the 9th District - Lists current Senators and representative, and map showing district outline
 The Political graveyard: U.S. Representatives from Michigan, 1807-2003
U.S. Representatives 1837-2003, Michigan Manual 2003-2004

 Congressional Biographical Directory of the United States 1774–present

09
Constituencies established in 1873
1873 establishments in Michigan